Yuliya Viktorovna Snigir (born 2 June 1983) is a Russian actress and model.

Life and career
Yuliya Snigir was born in Donskoy, Tula Oblast, Russian SFSR. She graduated from high school number 20 in Donskoy. Hoping to get a good education, she went to Moscow and entered the Faculty of Foreign Languages of the Moscow State Pedagogical University (English department, specialty "English Philology").

Snigir had to study and work at the same time to support herself financially. She was teaching English in the nursery school, when a friend showed photos of Yuliya to a representative from a Moscow modelling agency. While continuing her study program in University, Snigir became a successful model. She was offered a contract with a leading French jewellery brand and was planning to move to France when a casting-director saw her at the modeling agency and invited her to an audition. Her acting career started when she was accepted to the Vakhtangov Theatre Academy. Her cinematic debut was in the film The Last Slaughter, which was followed by Vaccine and Gloss.

Her big break through came when she was offered one of the leading roles in the Russian sci-fi blockbuster The Inhabited Island (2008) and the sequel The Inhabited Island: Skirmish. Yulia became the face of L'Oréal in Russia, as well as Mexx clothing and Mexx perfume.

She hosted the show Theory of Relativity on STS in 2009. In 2010 she became a TV presenter on the channel Petersburg – Channel 5.

She appeared in film A Good Day to Die Hard (2013) alongside Bruce Willis. In the film, she played a Russian antagonist named Irina.

In 2015, Channel One released a 12-episode historical television series Catherine the Great, in which the actress played the main role.

In 2019, Snigir married actor Yevgeny Tsyganov. They have one child together, a son.

Filmography

References

External links
 

1983 births
Living people
People from Donskoy, Tula Oblast
Russian activists against the 2022 Russian invasion of Ukraine
Russian female models
Russian film actresses
Russian television actresses
Russian stage actresses
21st-century Russian actresses